Xander is an abbreviated form of the name Alexander and pronounced like "Zander". Alexander is the Latin form of the Greek name "Alexandros". The name's meaning is interpreted from "alexein" which means "to defend" plus "andros" which translates to "man, warrior" in a relationship or possessive form. Hence the meaning: defender of man.

People
Music
Xander (Danish singer) (born 1988), Danish singer (full name Alexander Theo Linnet)
Xander (Dutch singer) (born  1985), Dutch singer songwriter (full name Xander Venema)
Xander (South Korean singer) (born 1988), also known as Alexander (full name Alexander Lee Eusebio) 
Xander de Buisonjé, (born 1973), Dutch singer
Xander Rawlins, a British singer-songwriter known for his British Army charity single "1000 Miles Apart" 

In arts and entertainment
Alexander Armstrong (or Xander Armstrong; born 1970), British comedian, actor and television presenter
Xander Bennett (born 1984), Australian screenwriter and author
Xander Berkeley (born 1955), American actor
Xander Marro (born 1975), puppet-maker and projectionist
Xander Mobus  (born 1992), American voice actor
Xander Parish, English ballet dancer
Xander Straat (born 1965), Dutch stage, television, and film actor

Sports
Xander Bogaerts (born 1992), baseball shortstop on the Boston Red Sox
Xander Houtkoop (born 1989), Dutch professional footballer
Xander Pitchers (born 1994), Namibian cricketer
Xander Schauffele (born 1993), American professional golfer

Fictional characters
Xander Harris, a main character in the television series Buffy the Vampire Slayer
Xander Bly, the Green Mystic Ranger from Power Rangers: Mystic Force
Xander Cage, the protagonist of the xXx franchise, portrayed by Vin Diesel
Xander Crews, in the animated series Frisky Dingo

Xandir P. Wifflebottom, a character in the animated series Drawn Together.
Xander, boyfriend of Dana Brody in Homeland (TV series)
Xander Kiriakis, a fictional character on the NBC soap opera Days of Our Lives
Xander, a Nohrian prince in the game Fire Emblem Fates, the adopted brother of the main protagonist.
Xander Shakadera, fictional character in Beyblade
Xander Payne, a fictional character in Mega Man series by Archie Comics

See also
Alexander

Greek masculine given names
English masculine given names